Wambach is a German language name for streams, places and persons.  

It may refer to:

People
 Abby Wambach (born 1980), American soccer player
 Nel Wambach (born 1938), Dutch gymnast
 Peter Wambach (born 1946), American politician

Places
 Wambach, several tributaries of the Traun (river), Austria
 Wambach, a community of Schlangenbad, Hesse, Germany
 Wambach, name for the upper course of the Frischebach, Rhineland, Germany
 Wambach, left tributary of the Odenbach (Glan), Rhineland, Germany
 Wambach, right tributary of the Prüm, Rhineland, Germany

See also
Wembach, village in Baden-Württemberg, Germany.